The Lindau Nobel Laureate Meetings are annual scientific conferences held in Lindau, Bavaria, Germany, since 1951. Their aim is to bring together Nobel laureates and young scientists to foster scientific exchange between different generations, cultures and disciplines. The meetings assume a unique position amongst international scientific conferences, as from 30 to 65 Nobel laureates attending each edition they are the largest regular congregation of Nobel laureates in the world, apart from the Nobel Prize award ceremony in Stockholm.

Purpose 
Every Lindau Meeting consists of a multitude of scientific sessions like plenary lectures and panel discussions as well as a variety of networking and social events. The meetings are not centered on the presentation of research results, but instead, their main goals are the exchange of ideas and the discussion of topics globally relevant to all scientists. The Nobel laureates do not receive any kind of payment for their participation and are free to choose the topics of their presentations. Approximately 350 are members of the meetings’ Founders Assembly.

Billed by the organising Council for the Lindau Nobel Laureate Meetings as their ‘Mission Education’, the aim of the meetings is to facilitate the transfer of knowledge between Nobel laureates and young scientists but also among the international scientific community and the general public. The opportunity for participants to form international networks of scientists – e.g. through the Lindau Alumni Network – is also regarded as a prime objective by the organisers. The meetings' leitmotif is ‘Educate. Inspire. Connect.’

History
After World War II, Germany was disconnected from the international scientific community due to the ramifications of the Nazi regime. During this time, hardly any scientific conferences of high value took place in Germany.

Initial idea and establishment (1951) 
The two physicians Franz Karl Hein and Gustav Wilhelm Parade from Lindau, a small town located on the Bavarian shore of Lake Constance, conceived the idea of organising a scientific meeting to bring together German researchers and physicians with Nobel laureates. They convinced Count Lennart Bernadotte af Wisborg, a member of the Swedish Royal Family and proprietor of nearby Mainau Island, to call upon his good connections to Sweden's Nobel Committee to support the undertaking. The first meeting, subsequently held in 1951, was dedicated to the fields of medicine and physiology and was attended by seven Nobel laureates, among them Adolf Butenandt and Hans von Euler-Chelpin. After the success of the initial meeting, the scientific scope was broadened to include the other two natural science Nobel Prize disciplines chemistry and physics. Thus, a mode of annually alternating disciplines for the meetings was established.

1954–2000 
In 1954, the Council for the Lindau Nobel Laureate Meetings was founded and henceforth established as the organising committee of the meetings. Count Lennart was appointed as first president of the Council. Also in 1954, the concept of inviting students and young scientists to the meetings was introduced. This step was seen as a measure to add additional value for society to the meetings. Among the young scientists participating that year were also students from Eastern Germany.

While originally conceived by Hein and Parade as a European meeting of scientists, the Lindau Nobel Laureate Meetings slowly but steadily became more international. In the beginnings, only students from Lake Constance's bordering countries Germany, Switzerland, and Austria attended but year after year new nations began to send representatives. Since 2000, each Lindau Meeting is attended by young scientists from between 80 and 90 or even up 100 countries.

In 1987, Count Bernadotte resigned from his position as president of the Council due to health reasons and his wife, Countess Sonja Bernadotte af Wisborg, took over.

2000–2008 
Shortly before the turn of the millennium, the future of the Lindau Nobel Laureate Meetings was endangered due to financial uncertainties. In order to counter this negative development, Countess Sonja Bernadotte expanded the Council and added experts from charitable foundations and public affairs as well as representatives of Stockholm's Nobel Foundation to the committee.

Two main goals of Countess Sonja Bernadotte's aegis were the further internationalisation of the meetings and to improve its public image, both domestically and internationally.

On the occasion of the 50th Lindau Nobel Laureate Meeting in the year 2000, the establishment of the Foundation Lindau Nobel Laureate Meetings was officially announced. Its main goal since then has been to secure the funding of the Lindau Nobel Laureate Meetings. Upon its creation, over 40 Nobel Laureates joined the Founders Assembly of the foundation and support the continuance of the conference both ideationally and financially.

The 50th Lindau Meeting in 2000 was also the first interdisciplinary meeting that united Nobel laureates and students from all three natural science disciplines (physics, chemistry and physiology or medicine) of the Nobel Prize.

2008–today 
When Countess Sonja Bernadotte died in October 2008, her daughter, Countess Bettina Bernadotte, was elected President of the Council. She continued her mother's course and worked on establishing further cooperation with research institutions around the world but also introduced educational aspects for society in general to the Lindau Meetings.

Meetings

Ever since their inception, the Lindau Nobel Laureate Meetings have taken place in the small Bavarian town of Lindau on the shores of Lake Constance. The city's center is located on an island in the lake that is connected to the mainland via bridges.

Meeting cycle 
The meetings focus alternately on physiology and medicine, physics, and chemistry – the three natural science Nobel Prize disciplines. Since 2000, an interdisciplinary meeting revolving around all three natural sciences is held every five years. In addition, since 2004 the Lindau Meeting on Economic Sciences is held every three years with recipients of the Sveriges Riksbank Prize in Economic Sciences in Memory of Alfred Nobel.

Scientific programme 
The following session types are currently part of the scientific programme of the Lindau Nobel Laureate Meetings:
 Lectures: Traditional presentations held by the Nobel laureates who are free to choose their topics.
 Agora Talks: The Agora Talks feature one or two Nobel laureates and a moderator, discussing a topic of the laureate’s choosing. Participants are given the opportunity to ask questions in an open forum setting. This format is especially suitable for controversial and new topics.
Discussion Sessions: In the afternoon, following their lectures, the Nobel laureates engage in intimate discussion sessions with the young scientists and answer their questions.
 Master Classes: Upon previous application, selected young scientists are given the chance to present their own research in front of an audience and receive feedback from the Nobel laureates.
 Panel Discussions: Several Nobel laureates and other meeting participants gather for a panel discussion and debate current issues in science. The audience has the opportunity to direct questions to the panelists.
 Science Breakfasts: Early-morning, panel discussions hosted by partner institutions and supporters of the meetings. 
Apart from the abovementioned, there are also other formats such as Poster Sessions, Science Walks, Laureate Lunches and Life Lectures.

Social programme 
The Lindau Nobel Laureate Meetings also host several events with social functions like dinners, BBQs and cultural events. Since 2010 one evening of each meeting is dedicated to an alternating partner country. The partner countries so far have been India (2009), the European Union (2010), the United States of America (2011), Singapore (2012), South Korea (2013), Australia (2014), France (2015), Austria (2016), Mexico (2017), China (2018) and South Africa (2019).

Boat trip to Mainau Island 
The last day of each meeting includes both scientific and social programme features with a boat trip to Mainau Island. The visit to the island owned by the Bernadotte family is designed both to let the meetings culminate in a final panel discussion on a topic combining science and society and to give the young scientists the opportunity to visit Mainau, the ‘flower island’.

Participants
Meetings dedicated to a single discipline are usually attended by about 30–40 Nobel laureates and 500–600 young scientists representing around 80 different countries. In addition, several special guests of honour from politics, business and academia as well as international journalists attend the meetings.

Application process 
Young scientists who want to participate need to pass a multi-stage application process. The application is open to undergraduates, PhD students and post-doc researchers under the age of 35 who are at the top of their class and do not hold a permanent position yet. Young scientists can only participate once in a Lindau meeting.

Outstanding guests 
Over the years many noteworthy guests of honour have visited the Lindau Nobel Laureate Meetings: Among them former German Presidents Roman Herzog, Johannes Rau, Horst Köhler and Christian Wulff. Former German President Joachim Gauck gave the opening address at the interdisciplinary meeting in 2015. German Chancellor Angela Merkel held the opening speech at the Lindau Meeting on Economic Sciences 2014 and 2017 it was the then president of the ECB Mario Draghi.
Further notable guests include philanthropist and software entrepreneur Bill Gates, former President of the European Commission José Manuel Barroso and the President of Singapore Tony Tan.

Organisation
The Lindau Nobel Laureate Meetings are made up of two legal bodies: The Council and the Foundation. While the council's responsibility is to put together the scientific programme and to organise the meetings via its executive secretariat, the foundation's task is to maintain the financial stability of the meetings and to ensure ongoing financial support.

Academic partners 
Applications for meeting participation need to be addressed to the academic partners, who in turn nominate the best young scientists for the meetings.The council sustains a global network of academic partner institutions that range from national science academies, to universities, foundations and government ministries.

Funding 
The Lindau meetings are funded by both public resources and private donations. The costs and funding of each meeting are made public in the annual report of the respective year. Private supporters are listed on the organisation's website and various other publications.

Impact 
Ever since their beginnings, the Lindau Nobel Laureate Meetings have aimed to facilitate an atmosphere in which scientists could assume more responsibility towards society. Therefore, several political appeals have been issued in Lindau over the years.

The impact these meetings have had on the careers of the roughly 35,000 young scientists, who have participated, is hard to quantify but profound – as one of the supporters put it: "You see the deep inspiration and motivation for the years to come in the eyes of the young researchers when they leave Lindau.”

Global networks 
The meetings provide many networking opportunities for young scientists who in turn form global networks that often yield research collaborations or knowledge transfer not limited by borders or differing cultures. The Lindau Alumni Network as well as regular events for former participants help to connect the Lindau Community even after the meetings.

Mainau declarations 

In 1955 at the 5th Lindau Nobel Laureate Meeting, German physics Nobel laureates Max Born and Otto Hahn initiated the ‘Mainau Declaration against the Use of Nuclear Weapons’ that was meant to urge world leaders to abstain from using nuclear weapons. It was initially signed by 18 Nobel laureates attending the meeting, but the number of signatories grew to 52 within a year.

Sixty years later, at the 65th Lindau Nobel Laureate Meeting in the summer of 2015, a second Mainau Declaration was issued, this time making a statement on the need to combat climate change. The declaration was initially signed by 36 attending Nobel laureates who were later joined by 35 additional colleagues.

In the tradition of the “Mainau Declarations”, Nobel laureate Elizabeth Blackburn initiated the “Lindau Guidelines” in her opening speech during the 68th Lindau Nobel Laureate Meeting. The initiative formulates guidelines for global, sustainable and cooperative open science in the 21st century. The “Lindau Guidelines” currently comprise 10 goals, which are still openly discussed and are to be officially adopted and signed at the 70th Lindau Nobel Laureate Meeting in 2021.

Asian Science Camp

The Asian Science Camp, an annual forum for pre-collegiate and college students which aims at promoting discussion and cooperation among Asian students for the betterment of science in the Asian region, is modeled after the Lindau meetings. This idea of an annual camp was co-proposed by Yuan Tseh Lee and Masatoshi Koshiba at the 2005 Nobel Laureate Meetings at Lindau. With the exception of the Covid-19 pandemic, the forum has been meeting annually since 2007.

Mediatheque 
Due to the fact that the Lindau Meetings have such a long tradition and history, a digital and open to the public archive was established. It currently contains about 400 hours of video footage of lectures held by Nobel laureates during the Lindau meetings. In addition, photos, animated educational films and interactive content like virtual tours of Nobel laureates’ laboratories and an interactive map showing the career paths of the laureates are also available.
The mediatheque is also used as an educational tool providing topic dossiers and introductions to certain scientific fields that can be used by teachers and professors.

Other projects and outreach 
The Lindau Nobel Laureate Meetings are also actively engaging in outreach projects and science communication based on their ‘Mission Education’ leitmotif. Among these projects are the photo exhibition ‘Sketches of Science’ by German photographer Volker Steger being exhibited world-wide and a permanent exhibition on the history of the meetings in Lindau's city museum. Additional educational content is provided through close collaborations with media partners such as the Nature Publishing Group.

For the first time in its almost 70-year history, the meetings planned for 2020 had to be postponed to the following year due to the global COVID-19 , Lindau Alumni and young scientists met online and exchanged ideas virtually during the Online Science Days 2020 and the Online Sciathon 2020.

Footnotes

References
 
 Burmester, Ralph (2015), Science at First Hand. 65 years of Lindau Nobel Laureate Meetings, Deutsches Museum Bonn

External links
www.lindau-nobel.org - official website
http://mediatheque.lindau-nobel.org - online archive with videos of Nobel laureate lectures

Nobel Prize
Science conferences
International conferences in Germany
Recurring events established in 1951
Annual events in Germany
Science websites